Kent Warwick Main (born 8 January 1996) is a South African cyclist, who currently rides for UCI Continental team .

Major results

2014
 3rd Road race, National Junior Road Championships
2017
 1st Overall Tour of Good Hope
1st Stage 3
2018
 2nd Time trial, National Under-23 Road Championships
 2nd Overall Tour of Good Hope
1st Stage 3
2019
 African Games
1st  Team time trial
2nd  Time trial
 2nd Overall Tour de Limpopo
 4th Time trial, National Road Championships
 6th Overall Tour of Iran (Azerbaijan)
 9th Overall Tour of Good Hope
2020
 3rd Time trial, National Road Championships
 3rd Overall Tour du Rwanda
2021
 African Road Championships
1st  Team time trial
1st  Mixed team relay
2nd  Time trial
 National Road Championships
3rd Time trial
4th Road race
 10th Overall Tour du Rwanda
2022
 2nd  Team time trial, African Road Championships
 National Road Championships
2nd Time trial
4th Road race
 7th Overall Tour du Rwanda
1st Stage 4

References

External links
 
 
 

1996 births
Living people
South African male cyclists
Sportspeople from Johannesburg
African Games gold medalists for South Africa
African Games silver medalists for South Africa
African Games medalists in cycling
Competitors at the 2019 African Games
20th-century South African people
21st-century South African people